The timeline of the Kingdom of Jerusalem presents important events in the history of the Kingdom of Jerusalema Crusader state in modern day Israel and Jordanin chronological order. The kingdom was established after the First Crusade in 1099. Its first ruler Godfrey of Bouillon did not take the title of king and swore fealty to the Latin Patriarch of Jerusalem, Daimbert. Godfrey's brother and successor Baldwin I was crowned the first king of Jerusalem without doing homage to the patriarch in 1100. By 1153, Baldwin I and his successors captured all towns on the Palestinian coast with the support of Pisan, Genoese and Venetian fleets and also took control of the caravan routes between Egypt and Syria. The kings regularly administered other crusader statesthe Counties of Edessa and Tripoli and the Principality of Antiochon behalf of their absent or underage rulers.

The polarisation of the Muslim world enabled the crusaders (colloquially known as Franks in the Levant) to consolidate their rule in Palestine. They could also appeal to the popes and the European rulers for help against their enemies. In the mid-twelfth century, Baldwin III and his successor Amalric maintained a close alliance with the Byzantine Empire, but they could not prevent the ruler of Aleppo, Nur ad-Din, from uniting the Muslim states in Syria in the 1150s. Internal strife weakened the kingdom during the reigns of the leper Baldwin IV and the unpopular Guy of Lusignan. This facilitated Nur ad-Din's former general, Saladin, to unite Egypt and Syria in the 1180s. Saladin annihilated the crusader army in the Battle of Hattin on 4 July 1187, and occupied almost the whole kingdom during the following months.

An Italian crusader, Conrad of Montferrat, saved Tyre and the Third Crusade forced Saladin to acknowledge the restoration of the Franks' rule in most coastal towns in his 1192 truce with Richard I of England. Further lands were recovered during the reigns of Henry of Champagne and Aimery of Lusignan, and Frederick II, Holy Roman Emperor, also restored the Franks' rule in Jerusalem in 1229. Frederick and his successors were absent monarchs and the kingdom was administered by regents (or bailiffs) from 1229 to 1269. Due to conflicts between the kings' representatives and the powerful barons, and the War of Saint Sabas between Genoa and Venice, the kingdom disintegrated into autonomous towns and lordships by the 1260s. The personal union of Jerusalem and Cyprus could not prevent the Mamluks of Egypt from occupying the last Frankish outposts in 1291. In addition to the Lusignan kings of Cyprus, the Angevin rulers of Naples and their successors maintained a claim to the defunct Jerusalemite kingdom for centuries.

Background

1009
 September 27. The Fatimid caliph al-Hakim orders the destruction of the Church of the Holy Sepulchre in Jerusalem. The subsequent persecution of Christians lasts for more than a decade.

1027
 The Holy Sepulchre is rebuilt after a Byzantine–Fatimid treaty.
1055
 December 18. The Seljuk ruler Tughril seizes Baghdad as the Abbasid caliphs' protector. During the following decades, the Seljuks expand their empire towards the Levant fighting the Fatimids and the Byzantines.
1063
 A Byzantine–Fatimid treaty strengthens the position of Byzantine emperor Constantine X Doukas as the patron of the Christians in the Fatimid Caliphate. The Christians settle in their own fortified quarter in Jerusalem.
1063-1070
 Merchants from Amalfi establish the Benedictine Saint Mary of the Latins Abbey in Jerusalem. 
Before 1070
 The Hospital of St. John is founded for male pilgrims as the abbey's dependency. They become independent sometime near time of the capture of Jerusalem.
1071
 August 21. Battle of Manzikert: the Seljuk Turks overcome the Byzantines and invade Asia Minor.

 A Seljuk Turk commander, Atsiz ibn Uvaq, captures Jerusalem from the Fatimides.
1074
 March 1. Pope Gregory VII is planning to launch a military campaign against the Seljuk Turks for the liberation of the Holy Land.
1080s
 The Gregorian theologians Anselm of Lucca, Bonizo of Sutri and John of Mantua complete the Roman Catholic ideology of holy wars.
1092
 November. The Seljuk sultan Malik-Shah I dies and his empire disintegrates into small states.
1095
 March. The Byzantine Emperor Alexios I Komnenos's envoys seek Pope Urban II's support for raising western troops against the Seljuk Turks.
 November 27. Urban II proclaims the First Crusade at the Council of Clermont.

 December 1. Raymond IV, Count of Toulouse, is the first ruler to join the crusade.
1096
 August 15. Godfrey of Bouillon, Duke of Lower Lotharingia, departs for the crusade. His brother, Baldwin of Boulogne, and their kinsman, Baldwin of Bourcq, accompany him.
1097
  January 20. Godfrey swears fealty to Alexios I in Constantinople.
1098
 March. The crusaders offer their assistance to the Fatimids against the Seljuk Turks in return for Jerusalem.
 March 10. County of Edessa established under Baldwin of Boulogne.
 June 28. Siege of Antioch ends with a crusader victory. Bohemond I given command of a crusader army and becomes the first Prince of Antioch shortly thereafter.
 August 26. Al-Afdal, the Fatimid vizier, captures Jerusalem.
 October 18. Simeon II, the exiled Orthodox Patriarch of Jerusalem, and the papal legate, Adhemar of Le Puy, propagate the crusade in a common letter circulated in Europe.
1099
 January 13. Raymond IV and Tancred depart after the Siege of Maarrat al-Nu'man to continue the crusade.
 February 14. Raymond IV cannot continue his campaign without other crusader leaders' support and besieges Arqa.
 Spring. Al-Afdal refuses to make an alliance with the crusaders, but he offers to grant entry into Jerusalem to unarmed pilgrims.
  April 1. The protracted siege of Arqa forces Raymond IV to seek Godfrey's and Robert II of Flanders' assistance.
  April 10. Byzantine envoys inform the crusaders about Alexios I's plan to invade Palestine in late June.
 Early May. Ignoring Raymond IV's protests, the crusaders depart for Jerusalem before the arrival of the Byzantine army.

First kingdom

Establishment (1099-1100)

1099
 May 19. The crusaders cross the Dog River into Palestine.
 June 3. The crusaders seize Ramla and establish the Roman Catholic Diocese of Lydda and Ramla. The first bishop, Robert, fixes the tributes payable on his estates to attract Syrian and Frank colonists to settle there setting the pattern for privileges to colonists.
 June 7. The crusaders (1,200–1,300 knights and 10,700–10,800 foot-soldiers) reach Jerusalem. The defenders nail crosses on the walls and desecrate them.
 June 17. A Genoese fleet captures Jaffa.
 Early July. Tancred captures Bethlehem and places his banner over the Church of the Nativity. The clergymen demand that the Holy Land be transformed into a spiritual realm, protected by secular lords.
 July 8. A visionary priest, Peter Desiderius, persuades the crusaders to make a penitentiary procession around the walls of Jerusalem.
 July 15. The crusaders capture Jerusalem. They massacre or enslave 3,000 Muslims and Jews.

 July 22. Godfrey is elected as the first Latin ruler of Jerusalem.
 July 29. Urban II dies. Paschal II elected as successor two weeks later.
 Late July. Raymond IV declines to cede the Tower of David to Godfrey, but his deputy allows Godfrey's soldiers to take possession of it.
 August 1. Arnulf of Chocques is elected as the first Latin Patriarch of Jerusalem. He expels the local ChristianArmenian, Copt, Jacobite and Nestorianclergy from the Holy Sepulchre.
 August 12. Battle of Ascalon: the crusaders route al-Afdal's army.
  August 30. Most crusaders leave the Holy Land for Europe.
 Early September. A Pisan fleet arrives at Syria under the command of Daimbert, Archbishop of Pisa.
 October 15–December 15. Godfrey unsuccessfully besieges Arsuf.
 December 21. Daimbert, Bohemond I and Baldwin of Boulogne come to Jerusalem, accompanied by thousands of pilgrims.  

 December 25. Arnulf abdicates and Daimbert becomes the new Latin patriarch. Godfrey and Bohemond I swear fealty to Daimbert.
 1100
 A decree reportedly directed against those who leave the Holy Land in difficult times stipulates that a man who lives in a house for more than a year seizes its possession against its absent owner.
 Godfrey founds the Benedictine Abbey of Saint Mary of the Valley of Jehosaphat site of believed to be the Tomb of the Virgin Mary. Many of the early queens of Jerusalem would be buried there, separate from their husbands.
1100
 February. The emirs of Ascalon, Caesarea and Acre pay tribute to Godfrey to prevent him from making plundering raids.
 February 2. Godfrey grants a quarter of Jaffa to Daimbert.
 April 1. Godfrey cedes Jaffa and Jerusalem to Daimbert, retaining possession until further conquests. Daimbert would not ultimately take possession of either.
 Early April. The Pisan fleet sails for Italy.
  June 10. The Doge of Venice Vitale I Michiel arrives at Jaffa at the head of a fleet of 200 ships. His treaty with Godfrey's representatives establishes the Venetians' right to have their own quarter and church in the towns in the Holy Land.
 July 18. Godfrey dies unexpectedly.
  July 22. Godfrey's retainers seize the Tower of David and urge his brother, Baldwin, to claim Jerusalem.
  August 1. Daimbert asks Bohemond I to prevent Baldwin from coming to Jerusalem.
  August 15. Danishmend Gazi captures Bohemond I near Melitene.
 August 20. Tancred's troops and the Venetians capture Haifa and massacre the townspeople.
 October 2. Baldwin grants Edessa to Baldwin of Bourcq and departs for Jerusalem.
 Late October. Baldwin's supporters prevent Tancred from seizing Jerusalem and Jaffa. Daimbert takes refuge at a monastery on Mount Zion.
 November 9. The burghers of Jerusalem ceremoniously receive Baldwin.
 November 15–December 21. Baldwin makes raids as far as Ascalon and Wadi Musa.
 December 25. Daimbert crowns the new king, now known as Baldwin I of Jerusalem, in the Church of the Nativity.

Consolidation (1101-1124)
1100s
 The Romanesque Church of Saint Anne is built in Jerusalem.

1101
 January–February. Geldemar Carpenel accuses Tancred of having unlawfully deprived him of Haifa, but Tancred does not answer the charges.
 Early March. After Tancred departs for Antioch to serve as regent, Baldwin I distributes his domains between Geldemar Carpenel and Hugh of Fauquembergues. A papal legate, Maurice of Porto, comes to Jerusalem.
 Easter. A Genoese fleet arrives at Jaffa. The Greek Orthodox monks are allowed to return to the Holy Sepulchre to secure the celebration of the Holy Fire. 
 May. Baldwin I and the Genoese capture Arsuf and Caesarea.
 May. The Crusade of 1101 begins.
 August–September. The forces of Kilij Arslan massacre most crusaders at Mersivan and Heraclea Cybistra.
 September 7. First Battle of Ramla: Baldwin I routes a Fatimid army, but one-third of his troops perishes in the battlefield.
 Winter. Daimbert is deposed at a church council in the papal legate's presence.
1102
 Easter. Stephen, Count of Blois; Stephen I, Count of Burgundy, and other survivors of the Crusade of 1101 stay in Jerusalem.
 May 17. Second Battle of Ramla: Al-Afdal's son, Sharaf al-Ma'ali, almost annihilates the Frank army. Baldwin I appeals for help to Tancred.
 May 28. After gathering new troops, Baldwin I forces Sharaf al-Ma'ali to return to Egypt.
 Late May. Tancred tries to achieve Daimbert's restoration, but the new papal legate, Robert of St Eusebio, confirms Daimbert's deposition. A popular cleric, Evremar, is appointed as the Latin patriarch.
1103
 April. Baldwin I besieges Acre, but cannot capture it.
 July. Baldwin I is seriously wounded in a skirmish near Caesarea.
1103–1106
 Baldwin I forces his wife Arda of Armenia into a monastery. She moves to Constantinople.
 1104
 The Jacobite metropolitan of Jerusalem Ignatius II persuades Baldwin I to restore the estates of his see to him.
1104
 May 25. Siege of Acre: Baldwin I captures Acre with the assistance of Genoese and Pisan fleets. The fields around the town are turned over to sugarcane growing and sugar refineries are established after the Italian merchants start to deliver sugar to Europe.
 Autumn. Daimbert sails for Italy to achieve his restoration in Rome.
1105
 February 28. Raymond IV dies and his cousin, William Jordan, continues the Siege of Tripoli.
 August 27. Third Battle of Ramla: Baldwin I defeats the united Fatimid and Seljuk armies. 

 1107
 Baldwin I starts to grant "money fiefs"a share of royal revenuesto his knights.
1106–1108
 Daniel the Traveller, an abbot from Kievan Rus', makes a pilgrimage in the Holy Land. He visits Orthodox monasteries, many of which have been ruined.
1107
 June. The pope reinstates Daimbert as Latin patriarch. He dies on June 16 before he could resume his position.
1108
 The new papal legate, Archbishop Ghibbelin of Arles, deposes Evremar at a church council. Ghibbelin is elected as the Latin patriarch.
1109
 March. Raymond IV's son, Bertrand, lays claim to Raymond IV's inheritance against William Jordan. William Jordan makes an alliance with Tancred and Bertrand swears fealty to Baldwin I. 
 April. Baldwin I summons Tancred and Tancred's opponents, Bertrand, Baldwin II of Edessa and Joscelin of Courtenay, to a general assembly at the crusaders' camp at Tripoli in the name of the "whole church of Jerusalem". The assembly confirms Bertrand's claim to Tripoli and Baldwin I grants Galilee to Tancred.
 July 12. The crusaders capture and sack Tripoli. Baldwin I grants a safe-conduct to the burghers, but he cannot prevent the Genoese from killing many of them.
1110
 May 12. Baldwin I and a Genoese fleet capture Beirut. The crusaders massacre the townspeople.
 Early summer. Baldwin I and Bertrand make a joint military campaign against Mawdud, the atabeg of Mosul, to protect Edessa.
 December 4. Siege of Sidon: Baldwin I, Sigurd I of Norway and a Venetian fleet capture coastal city of Sidon. The Muslim burghers remain in the town. 
1111
 February 17 and 24. A qadi from Aleppo, Ibn al-Khashshab, a Hashemite sharif and many Muslim commoners urge Seljuk Sultan Muhammad I Tapar in the principal mosques in Baghdad to start a holy war against the crusaders.
 The pope confirms the jurisdiction of the Latin Patriarchs of Jerusalem over the newly established Roman Catholic bishoprics of Sidon and Beirut, ignoring the traditional boundary between the patriarchal sees of Antioch and Jerusalem.
1112
 Lent. Patriarch Ghibbelin dies.
 December. Arnoulf of Chocques elected as the Latin patriarch. 
1113
 15 February. The pope issues papal bull Pie postulatio voluntatis recognizing the Knights Hospitaller and confirming its independence from lay authorities.
 May–June. Mawdud and Toghtekin, the atabeg of Damascus, invade Galilee.
 June 28. Battle of al-Sannabra: Mawdud and Toghtekin defeat Baldwin I.
 July–August. Mawdud makes raids as far as Ascalon.
 August. Baldwin I marries the wealthy Adelaide del Vasto after promising to name her son Roger II of Sicily as his heir.
1114
 The Canons Regular of the Holy Sepulchre adopt the Rule of St. Augustine.
1115
 The papal legate, Berengar, Bishop of Orange, deposes Patriarch Arnulf primarily for Baldwin I's bigamous marriage.
 Pagan is named as the first chancellor of Jerusalem.
 The construction of Montreal Castle in Oultrejordain begins. Baldwin I grants estates to the knights and commoners who settle near the castle. The region develops into an important center of sugarcane growing.
 1116
 Castles are built near Petra and Aqaba to control the caravan routes between Egypt and Syria.
 Baldwin I grants liberties to local Christians who move from Oultrejourdain to Jerusalem.
1117
 April 25. Adelaide departs for Sicily after her marriage to Baldwin I was annulled at a church council convoked by Arnoulf of Chocques.

 July 19. The pope appoints Arnoulf of Chocques as the Latin patriarch.
1118
 March. Baldwin I invades Egypt. He falls seriously ill in Pelusium.
 April 2. Baldwin I dies at Arish. Envoys are sent to his brother, Eustace III, Count of Boulogne, offering him the throne.
 April 14. Baldwin II of Edessa comes to Jerusalem. Patriarch Arnulf and Joscelin of Courtenay achieve his election as Baldwin I's successor.
 Late April. Patriarch Arnulf dies. Baldwin II secures the direct royal control of the most important towns and the noblemen swear fealty to him at a general assembly.
 May. Toghtekin invades Galilee. Al-Afdal gathers his troops at Ascalon and Toghtekin joins him.
 May–July. Baldwin II and troops from Antioch and Tripoli prevent Al-Afdal and Toghtekin from launching a joint campaign against the kingdom.
 Late summer. Baldwin II invades Damascene territory and routes Toghtekin's son, Taj al-Muluk Buri.
 August–September. Warmund of Picquigny is elected as the Latin patriarch.
1119
 Patriarch Warmund confirms the Knights Templar established by Hugues de Payens and other knights to protect the pilgrims. Baldwin II cedes a part of the royal palace, identified as Solomon's Temple, to them.
 June 28. Battle of the "Field of Blood": the Artuqid ruler of Mardin Ilghazi almost annihilates the Antiochene army.
 Late July. Baldwin II is acknowledged as regent for the absent minor prince of Antioch, Bohemond II.
 August 14. Battle of Hab: Baldwin II forces Ilghazi and Toghtekin to withdraw from Antiochene territory.
 August–September. Baldwin II grants the County of Edessa to Joscelin.
 December 25. Baldwin II is crowned king in Bethlehem.
1120
 January 16. Council of Nablus: the Jerusalemite prelates and barons adopt laws against sexual misconduct and confirm the right of the Church to collect the tithe. Baldwin II abolishes customs on food delivered to Jerusalem.

 January 23. Baldwin II appeals to Pope Calixtus II and to Venice for assistance against the Muslim powers.
 May. Fulk V, Count of Anjou, comes to the Holy Land.
 June. Ilghazi invades Antiochene territories. Baldwin II returns to Syria, ignoring his Jerusalemite vassals' opposition to the campaign.
1120s
 The canons of the Holy Sepulchre open a school.
1121
 April–June. Baldwin II conducts a series of military expeditions in Syria.
 June. Toghtekin invades Galilee, forcing Baldwin II to return from Syria.
 July. Baldwin II captures and destroys the fortress built by Toghtekin at Jerash in the previous year.
 August–October. Baldwin II conducts new campaigns in Syria.
1122
 January. Fulk V hires 100 knights for the defence of the Holy Land before his departure for Europe.
 Early. Baldwin II forces Pons, Count of Tripoli, into obedience.
 September 13. Joscelin I is captured by Nur al-Daulak Balak.
 Autumn. Baldwin II appoints Geoffrey of Marash to administer the County of Edessa.
1123
 April 18. Balak captures Baldwin II in Syria.
 Late April. Patriarch Warmund convokes a general assembly which elects Eustace Grenier as bailiff (or regent) for the captive Baldwin II.
 May. The Doge of Venice Domenico Michiel arrives at Jaffa and the Venetians defeat a Fatimid fleet.
 May 29. Fatimid troops invade the kingdom, but the Jerusalemite army defeats them near Ibelin.
 June 15. Eustace Grenier dies. William I of Bures is elected as bailiff.
 December. Pactum Warmundi: Patriarch Warmund, William I of Bures and the chancellor, Pagan, grant privileges to the Venetians.
1123 or 1124
 A group of barons offers the throne to Charles I, Count of Flanders, but he does not accept the offer.
1124
 February 16. The Venetians and the Franks lay siege to Tyre.
 July 7 or 8. The fall of Tyre to the Franks. The Muslim burghers remain in the town. The Venetians receive more than 15 nearby villages, and they grant most of them to Venetian noble families. The region becomes the most important center of sugarcane growing in the kingdom.
 August 29. Ilghazi son's, Timurtash, releases Baldwin II for ransom.
 October 6. Baldwin II lays siege to Aleppo.
 Late. Timurtash refuses to assist the burghers of Aleppo. Ibn al-Khashshab turns to the atabeg of Mosul Aqsunqur al-Bursuqi for assistance.

Heyday (1125-1144)

1125
 January 25. Al-Bursuqi forces Baldwin II to lift the siege of Aleppo and unites Aleppo with Mosul.
 April 3. Baldwin II returns to Jerusalem for the first time since 1121.
 May 2. Privilegium Balduini: Baldwin II modifies the terms of the Pactum Warmundi to strengthen royal authority.
 June 11. Baldwin II, Pons and Joscelin I defeat the united forces of Al-Bursuqi and Toghtekin near Azaz.
1126
 Late January. Baldwin II defeats Toghtekin on the plain of Marj al-Saffar.
 March–July. Baldwin II and Pons conduct joint campaigns in Syria.
 October. Bohemond II comes to Antioch and marries Baldwin II's daughter, Alice.
1127
 April. Seljuk Sultan Mahmud II appoints Imad ad-Din Zengi to administer Mosul and Aleppo.
 October. William I of Bures is sent to France to offer the hand of Baldwin II's eldest daughter, Melisende, to Fulk V of Anjou.
1127
 Summer. Baldwin II mediates a reconciliation between Bohemond II and Joscelin I in Syria.
1128
 January. Zengi's troops capture Aleppo.
 July 27. Patriarch Warmund dies.
 Summer or Autumn. Baldwin II's relative, Stephen of La Ferté, is made the Latin patriarch.
1129
 January. The Templars' Latin Rule is confirmed at the Council of Troyes.
 May. Fulk V comes to Jerusalem and marries Melisende after Baldwin II promises to appoint him as his sole heir.
 September 4. Toghtekin's son and successor, Taj al-Muluk Buri, orders a purge against the Assassins in Damascus. Their leader Ismail al-Ajami offers to cede Banias to Baldwin II.
 November. The Franks seize Banias and invade Damascene territory, but Buri routes them on Marj al-Saffar.
 1130
 Patriarch Stephen demands Jaffa from Baldwin II.
 Leprous knights establish the Order of Saint Lazarus.
1130
 February. Bohemond II is killed during a raid and the Antiochene lords offer the regency for his daughter by Alice, Constance, to Baldwin II. Alice seeks Zengi's assistance against Baldwin II, but he seizes Antioch and appoints Joscelin I to administer it.
 June. Patriarch Stephen dies. His successor, William of Malines, abandons Stephen's claims to Jaffa.
1131
 August. The dying Baldwin II names Fulk, Melisende and their son, Baldwin, as his co-heirs.
 August 21. Baldwin II dies in Jerusalem.
 September 14. Fulk and Melisende are crowned in the Holy Sepulchre. Fulk starts replacing his late father-in-law's officials with his own supporters.

 1132– 1135
 Fulk's sister, Ermengarde, makes a pilgrimage in the Holy Land. 
1132
 Summer. Alice and Pons conclude an alliance against Fulk, but Fulk prevents her from assuming the regency in Antioch and defeats Pons near Chastel Rouge.
 December 21. Buri's son and successor, Shams-ul-Mulk Isma'il, captures Banias.
1133
 Spring. Fulk and Pons defeat Turkmen raiders. Fulk overcomes Zengi's general, Sawar, near Qinnasrin.
 Patriarch Stephen begins the construction of Chastel Hernaut to protect the pilgrims on the road between Jaffa and Jerusalem.
1134
 Late. Walter I Grenier accuses his stepfather, Hugh II of Jaffa, of plotting against Fulk. Hugh rises up and seeks the Fatimids' assistance. Patriarch William mediates a reconciliation and Hugh leaves for Italy.
 Fulk orders the construction of a castle at Bayt Jibrin near Ascalon.
 1135
 Fulk commissions a splendid psalter for Melisende.

1135
 August. Fulk allows Alice to return to Antioch.
1136
 April. Fulk's candidate, Raymond of Poitiers, marries Constance in Antioch.
 Fulk gives Bethgibelin to the Hospitallers. The grant shows the militarization of the order.
1137
 July 11. Battle of Ba'rin: Zengi defeats Fulk and Raymond II, Count of Tripoli.
 September. John II Komnenos besieges Antioch. Fulk authorizes Raymond to swear fealty to the Emperor.
1138
 February 5. Melisende establishes the Saint Lazarus Abbey at Bethany and appoints her sister, Yvetta, as its first abbess.
 July. The Archbishop of Tyre, Fulcher of Angoulême, cannot persuade Pope Innocent II to restore the authority of Tyre over bishoprics in the County of Tripoli and the Principality of Antioch. In retaliation for Fulcher's independent action, Patriarch William takes direct control of the see of Tyre and its suffragans.
1139
 Innocent II orders Patriarch William to restore the see of Tyre to Archbishop Fulcher.
 March 29. Innocent II issues papal bull Omne datum optimum offering papal protection to the Knights Templar.
 Summer. Fulk and his son-in-law, Thierry, Count of Flanders, capture a cave fortress at Ajloun.
 December. Mu'in ad-Din Unur, atabeg of Damascus, makes an alliance with Fulk and offers Banias to him.
1140
 May. Zengi besieges Damascus, but the gathering of Jerusalemite troops near Tiberias forces him to lift the siege.
 June 12. Jerusalemite and Damascene troops capture Banias.
1141
 The papal legate, Bishop Alberic of Ostia, consecrates the Dome of the Rock, transforming it into a church.
1142
 Castle Blanchegarde is built near Ascalon and Kerak is erected in Oultrejourdain. Frank colonists settle near Kerak which develops into an important center of rural industries. Before long, a large communal oven is built in Kerak.

 December 25. Patriarch William crowns and anoints Fulk and Melisende's son, Baldwin III, in the Holy Sepulchre. Melisende is crowned for the second time together with her son.
1143
 November 10. Fulk dies in a hunting accident.
 December 25. Baldwin III becomes sole king of Jerusalem.
 Melisende appoints her cousin, Manasses of Hierges, as constable.
1144
 Spring. Baldwin III crushes a riot in Wadi Musa.
 December 24. Zengi captures Edessa before the relieving army sent by Melisende reaches the town.

Towards the union of Muslim Syria and Egypt (1145-1173)

1145
 September 25. Patriarch William dies.
 November. Envoys are sent from the crusader states to European rulers seeking their assistance for the recovery of Edessa.
 December 1. Pope Eugenius III issues papal bull Quantum praedecessores calling for the Second Crusade.
1146
 January 25. Fulcher of Angoulême is elected as the Latin patriarch.
 September 14. A eunuch slave murders Zengi. Zengi's younger son Nur ad-Din assumes control ofAleppo.
1146–1153
 Frank colonists receive houses, arable lands, vineyards and a share in the olive groves in the royal domain near Casal Imbert. They are to give two-thirds of the olives and one-third of the crops to the king. The king holds a monopoly over the bakery and the communal bath. 
1147
 Spring. Baldwin III makes a raid against the fertile Hauran region near Damascus.
 May–June. Nur ad-Din forces Baldwin III to withdraw from Damascene territory.
1148
 Melisende donates a village to the Jacobite metropolitanate of Jerusalem.
 March 19. Louis VII and the French crusaders reach Antioch.
  April 15. Conrad III of Germany and the German crusaders land at Acre.
 June 24. Council of Acre: Louis VII, Conrad III, Melisende, Baldwin III and other crusader leaders decide to conquer Damascus.

 July 23–27. The crusaders besiege Damascus, but troops coming from the Muslim countries force them to lift the siege.
 September 8. Conrad III and his army leave the Holy Land.
1149
 First reference to a Court of Burgesses in Jerusalem. Headed by the local viscounts, the Courts of Burgesses judge the Frank commoners in about 40 towns.
 May. Louis VII and the French crusaders depart for France.
 June 29. Battle of Inab: Nur ad-Din's general, Shirkuh, defeats and kills Raymond of Poitiers.
 July 15. Patriarch Fulcher consecrates the Romanesque basilica of the Holy Sepulchre.
 August. Baldwin III leads a relief army to Antioch.
before 1150
 Special courts of justice are set up to hear cases relating to fugitive serfs.
1150
 May. Baldwin III grants the newly built castle of Gaza to the Templars.
 May 4. Turkoman raiders capture Joscelin II.
 May–June. Melisende's supporters do not join Baldwin III's military campaign to Syria. Baldwin III permits Joscelin II's wife, Beatrice, to sell the remnants of the County of Edessa to the Byzantines.
1150s
 Baldwin III orders the collection of all coins and the issue of new ones to secure the royal control of coinage. 
 Baldwin, Viscount of Nablus, brings Muslim and Frank colonists to his estates.
 The Hospitallers settle colonists both from Palestinian towns and from France, Northern Italy and Catalonia in their estates at Bayt Jibrin.
1151
 Melisende makes her younger son, Amalric, the count of Jaffa.
 Spring. Nur ad-Din besieges Damascus, but Baldwin III's invasion of the Hauran forces him to abandon the siege.
 July. A Fatimid fleet makes a raid along the coast.
 Late. Assassins murder Raymond II. The Tripolitan lords swear allegiance to the minor Raymond III of Tripoli and his mother, Hodierna of Jerusalem, in Baldwin III's presence.
1152
 April. Baldwin III appoints Humphrey II of Toron as constable and captures Manasses of Hierges' castle at Mirabel. He forces Melisende to abdicate and deprives Amalric of Jaffa.

1153
 January 25. The crusaders lay siege to Ascalon.
 Spring. Baldwin III gives consent to the marriage of Constance of Antioch and Raynald of Châtillon.
 August 23. The Franks capture Ascalon, thus completing the conquest of the eastern coast of the Mediterranean Sea.
1154
 Baldwin III restores Jaffa to Amalric and also grants Ascalon to him.
 A royal confirmation of previous grants shows that non-Frank peasants (known as rustici or villani) are regularly donated to the Hospitallers. 
 April 25. Nur ad-Din captures Damascus, uniting the Muslim lands in Syria.
 1155
 About 500 French, Catalan, Italian and Frank peasants live in a village, known as Magna Mahumeria, on the estates of the canons of the Holy Sepulchre near Al-Bireh. This typical planned village of the age developed around a fortified manor house and consisted of small and narrowhouses with wide rubble and ashlar walls. The villagers collect water on the roofs to feed cisterns through pipes and channels. Documents refer to smiths, carpenters, builders, gardeners and shoemakers living in the village.
1155
 June. Nur ad-Din and Baldwin III conclude a one-year truce.
 October–November. Patriarch Fulcher and most of his suffragans accuse the Hospitallers of abusing their privileges, but Pope Hadrian IV does not condemn the knights.
1156
 June. The truce is renewed for a year after Nur ad-Din promises a tribute to Baldwin III.
1157
 May–June. Nur ad-Din besieges Banias, but Baldwin III relieves the fortress.
 July. Nur ad-Din again besieges Banias, but the united armies of Baldwin III, Raymond III and Raynald force him to withdraw his troops.
 September. Thierry, Count of Flanders, and Flemish crusaders land at Beirut.
 November. The united crusader forces capture Shaizar. Baldwin III grants it to Thierry, but after a debate between Thierry and Raynald about its status, the crusaders abandon it.
 November 20. Patriarch Fulcher dies.
 Late. Baldwin III's half-sister Sibylla and aunt Yvetta achieve the election of a French cleric, Amalric of Nesle, as the Latin patriarch. The archbishop of Caesarea and the bishop of Bethlehem appeal to the Holy See against his election.
1158
 February. The united crusader forces capture Haram.
 Spring. Baldwin III and Thierry make a raid against Damascene territory.
 May. Nur ad-Din besieges the castle of Habis Jaldak near Tiberias.
 July 15. Baldwin III and Thierry relieve Habis Jaldak. 
 September. Baldwin III marries Theodora, a niece of the Byzantine Emperor Manuel I Komnenos.
 Late. Pope Hadrian IV confirms Amalric of Nesle's election as patriarch.
1159
 Spring. After lengthy negotiations, Manuel I and Baldwin III conclude an alliance against Nur ad-Din near Antioch.
 April 12. Baldwin III and Raynald ceremoniously receive Manuel I in Antioch.   
 May. After Nur ad-Din releases his Christian prisoners and offers an alliance against the Seljuks of Rum, Manuel I leaves Syria for Constantinople.
 Baldwin III persuades the prelates and barons to remain neutral in the conflict between Pope Alexander III and his rival, Victor IV, at their general assembly in Nazareth. Later the prelates acknowledge Alexander III as the lawful pope.
1160
 November. After Nur ad-Din's soldiers capture Raynald, Baldwin III appoints the Latin patriarch of Antioch, Aimery of Limoges to administer Antioch.
1161
 September 11. Melisende dies.
1163
 February 10. Baldwin III dies childless in Beirut.
  February 15. The prelates and barons elect Baldwin III's brother, Amalric, as king only after Amalric's marriage to Agnes of Courtenay is annulled. Amalric achieves the confirmation of their children's legitimacy.

 February 18. Amalric is crowned king.
 September. Amalric besieges Bilbeis in Egypt. The Egyptians cut the dikes, forcing him to return to Jerusalem.
 1164
 Amalric's Assise sur la ligece obliges the vassals of his own vassals to swear fealty to him. 
1164
 Early. Amalric urges Louis VII to send reinforcements to the Holy Land.
 April. Nur ad-Din sends Shirkuh to Egypt to restore the former Fatimid vizier, Shawar.
 May. Shawar refuses to pay a tribute to Nur ad-Din. After Shirkuh captures Bilbeis, Shawar seeks Amalric's assistance.
 August–October. Amalric besieges Bilbeis.
 August 10. Battle of Harim: Nur ad-Din routes the united armies of Bohemond III of Antioch, Raymond III, Thoros II of Armenian Cilicia and Constantine Kalamanos, the Byzantine governor of Cilicia.
 September. Nur ad-Din captures Banias.
 October. Amalric and Shirkuh withdraw their troops from Egypt. Amalric assumes the regency for the captive Raymond III.
1167
 January. Shirkuh invades Egypt. Amalric convokes a general assembly to Nablus which votes a 10 percent tax on movable property to finance a new campaign against Shirkuh.
 January 30. Amalric invades Egypt.
 March. Shawar agrees to pay a yearly tribute to Amalric and the Fatimid Caliph Al-Adid confirms their treaty.
 March 18. Battle of al-Babein: an indecisive engagement between Amalric and Shirkuh's armies.
 Late March. Shirkuh seizes Alexandria. Amalric besieges it with the assistance of a Pisan fleet.
  August 1. Shirkuh agrees to abandon Alexandria in return for 40,000 dinars. Amalric is authorized to place a garrison in Alexandria. Shawar promises to pay a yearly tribute to Amalric.
 August 4. Shirkuh and his army depart for Damascus.
 Late August. Shawar's son, al-Kamil Shuja, offers allegiance to Nur ad-Din. 
 August 29. Amalric marries Manuel I's niece, Maria Komnene, in Tyre. Amalric proposes the division of the Fatimid Caliphate between the Byzantine Empire and the Kingdom of Jerusalem to the Emperor's envoys.

1168
 Amalric I secures the right of royal courts to judge Pisans who hold real estate in the kingdom.
 Easter. The Jacobite Patriarch Michael the Syrian meets with Patriarch Amalric in Jerusalem.
 September. Manuel I accepts Amalric's offer for a joint military campaign against the Fatimid Caliphate.
 Early October. The Grand Master of the Knights Hospitallers, Gilbert of Assailly, promises support to Amalric against Egypt. The Knights Templars decide not to participate in the campaign.
 November 4. Amalric's troops massacre the Muslim and Coptic townspeople at Bilbeis, which stirs up the Egyptians' resistance.
 November 13. Amalric lays siege to Cairo. Al-Adid seeks Nur ad-Din's assistance, but Shawar offers a tribute to Amalric.
 December 25. Shirkuh invades Egypt, forcing Amalric to lift the siege of Cairo.
1169
 January 2. Amalric withdraws his troops from Egypt.
 January 18. Shirkuh's nephew, Saladin, kills Shawar with Al-Adid's approval. Al-Adid appoints Shirkuh as vizier.
 March 23. Shirkuh dies.
 March 26. Al-Adid appoints Saladin as vizier.
 Summer. Amalric sends an embassy to France, England and Sicily to ask for a new crusade.
 September. A Byzantine fleet arrives at Acre.
 October–December. The Franks and the Byzantines unsuccessfully besiege Damietta.
 1170
 Amalric's only son and heir, Baldwin, is diagnosed with leprosy. 

1170
 December. Saladin destroys the Frank colonists' unfortified quarters at Darum and Gaza.
1171
 Early. New embassy is sent to the European rulers.
 March–July. Amalric convinces Manuel I to renew their alliance in Constantinople.
 September 13. Al-Adid's death puts an end to the Fatimid Caliphate and makes Saladin the undisputed ruler of Egypt.
 October. Saladin invades the kingdom and destroys the Frank colonists' quarter at Montreal. He returns to Egypt when he learns of Nur ad-Din's decision to participate in the campaign. Nur ad-Din accuses Saladin of disloyalty.
1173
 Outraged by the fall of the Fatimids, the Assassin leader, Rashid ad-Din Sinan, offers to convert to Christianity if the Templars do not tax the Assassins' subjects in Syria. Templars murder Sinan's envoys.
 Summer. Amalric sends a new embassy to Europe.
1174
 May 15. Nur ad-Din dies in Damascus.
 June. Amalric besieges Banias, but falls seriously ill.
 July 11. Amalric dies in Tiberias.

Decline and fall (1174-1187)
1174
 July 15. The ailing 13-year-old Baldwin IV is crowned king in the Holy Sepulchre. The senechal, Miles of Plancy, rules the kingdom.

 July 28. A Sicilian fleet besieges Alexandria. Conflicts between Miles and Humphrey III prevent the mobilization of the Jerusalemite army.
 August 1. The Sicilians lift the siege of Alexandria.
 August. Raymond III claims the regency as Baldwin IV's closest male relative.
 Early October. Miles is assassinated in Acre. His widow, Stephanie of Milly, accuses Raymond III of plotting against him.
 Late October. The High Court of Jerusalem elects Raymond III as bailiff. He marries the Princess of Galilee, Eschiva of Bures.
 October–December. Saladin occupies Damascus and Hama, forcing Nur ad-Din's son, As-Salih Ismail al-Malik, to withdraw to Aleppo.
1175
 January–February. Raymond III leads a relief army to Hama against Saladin. He abandons the campaign after Saladin releases the hostages held for his ransom.  
 July 22. Saladin and Raymond III conclude a truce.
1176
 Summer. The ruler of Aleppo, Gümüshtekin, releases Raynald of Châtillon and Baldwin IV's maternal uncle, Joscelin III of Courtenay.
 July. Baldwin IV comes of age.
 July–August. Baldwin IV and Raymond III make raids as far as Damascus.
 Late August. Baldwin IV appoints Joscelin III as senechal and arranges his marriage with a wealthy heiress, Agnes of Milly.
 September 17. Battle of Myriokephalon: the Seljuk Sultan of Rum Kilij Arslan II overcomes Manuel I's army.
 November. William Longswordthe eldest son of William V, Marquess of Montferratmarries Baldwin IV's sister, Sibylla. William is made the count of Jaffa and Ascalon.
 Winter. Raynald is sent to Constantinople to negotiate with Manuel I.
1177
 Spring. Raynald marries the lady of Oultrejourdain, Stephanie of Milly. Baldwin IV grants Hebron to him.
 June. William Longsword dies.
 Summer. Baldwin IV's health gets worse.
 August 1. Baldwin IV's cousin, Philip I, Count of Flanders, arrives at Acre. He refuses to assume the regency for Baldwin IV.
 August. A Byzantine fleet arrives at Acre, but the Franks refuse to participate in a joint campaign against Egypt.
 Autumn. Raynald is appointed as "procurator of the kingdom and the army".
 September. Phillip I, Raymond III and Bohemond II launch a military campaign in Syria, taking the bulk of the Jerusalemite army with them.
 Late November. Saladin launches a sudden attack against Ascalon.
 November 25. Battle of Montgisard: Baldwin IV routes Saladin.
1178
 January. The birth of William Longsword's posthumous son by Sybilla, Baldwin.
 October. Baldwin IV orders the building of the fortress La Chastellet at Jacob's Ford.
1179
 February. The grand masters of the Templars and the Hospitallers, Odo de St Amand and Roger de Moulins, sign an agreement to settle their disputes.
 April. Baldwin IV gives La Chastellet to the Templars. Humphrey III dies after receiving fatal wounds during a raid against Banias. Agnes of Courtney's favorite, Aimery of Lusignan, is made a constable.
 May. Saladin raids the region of Jacob's Ford.
 June 10. Battle of Marj Ayyun: Saladin routes Baldwin IV.
 August 29. Saladin destroys La Chastellet.
 September. Saladin makes raids as far as Beirut and Tyre. 
 1180
 According to a letter of grant, the burghers of Palmeria are entitled to freely dispose of their property, but they cannot sell it to clerics or the military orders.
1180
 April 20. Bohemond II and Raymond III march to Jerusalem unexpectedly. Regarding their action as an attempt to dethrone him, Baldwin IV hastily marries off Sybilla to Aimery's brother, Guy of Lusignan.

 May. Saladin accepts Baldwin IV's proposal for a two-year truce.
 Autumn. Baldwin IV's half-sister, Isabella, is betrothed to Raynald's stepson, Humphrey IV of Toron. Humphrey IV cedes his paternal domains to the king.
 October 6. Patriarch Amalric dies.
 October 16. Heraclius, Archbishop of Caesarea, is elected as Latin patriarch.
1181
 January 16. Pope Alexander III calls for a new crusade, emphasizing that the leper Baldwin IV is unable to defend the Holy Land.
 Summer. Ignoring the truce, Raynald attacks a caravan.
1182
 Spring. Baldwin IV prohibits Raymond III from entering the kingdom.
 April. Andronikos Komnenos' coup in Constantinople puts an end to Frankish influence in the Byzantine Empire.
 Summer. Baldwin IV keeps the royal army continuously in the field because of a series of raids from Syria and Egypt.
 August. Saladin besieges Beirut, but Baldwin IV relieves it.
 September. Baldwin IV recaptures the fort of Habis Jaldak.
1183
 February. A general council levies an extraordinary tax to cover the increasing defence costs. Raynald's fleet launches a raid on the Red Sea, menacing Mecca and Medina.
 June 11. Saladin captures Aleppo.
 September 29. Saladin invades Galilee.
 October. Baldwin IV appoints Guy as bailiff. The Frank troops assemble at the Springs of Saffuriya and Saladin returns to Syria. Guy's opponents accuse him of losing the opportunity to inflict a decisive defeat on Saladin.
 November. Guy refuses to exchange Jerusalem for Tyre with Baldwin IV. Humphrey IV marries Isabella in Kerak. Saladin besieges Kerak during the wedding.
 November 20. Baldwin IV orders Patriarch Heraclius to make preparations for the annulment of Guy and Sybilla's marriage. Sybilla's five-year-old son by William Longsword, Baldwin V, is crowned king.
 December 3 or 4. Baldwin IV and Raymond III relieve Kerak.
 December. Guy and Sybilla withdraw to Ascalon. Baldwin IV deprives him of Jaffa.
1184
 March 29. Patriarch Heraclius excommunicates William of Tyre, forcing him to abdicate the chancellorship.
 June. Envoys are sent to Europe to ask for a new crusade.
 Augustus 23–September 5. Second siege of Kerak by Saladin, but Baldwin IV relieves the fortress.
 October. Guy pillages a Beduin tribe in a royal domain.
 Late. Ibn Jubayr, a renowned poet from Al-Andalus, travels through the kingdom. He notes that the local Muslim peasants prefer the Franks' rule because they are required to pay less taxes than their peers in the Muslim countries. 
1185
 Early April. The dying Baldwin IV appoints Raymond III as bailiff for Baldwin V for ten years, but Joscelin III is made Baldwin V's guardian. The High Court rules that the Pope, the Holy Roman Emperor and the kings of France and England are to choose between Sybilla and Isabella's claims to the throne in case of Baldwin V's premature death.
  April 15. Baldwin IV dies.
 Spring. Saladin and Raymond III sign a truce which enables Saladin to invade Mosul.
 A Byzantine monk, John Phokas, makes a pilgrimage in the Holy Land. He visits Orthodox monasteries which have been rebuilt during the previous decades.
1186
 March 4. Izz ad-Din Mas'ud, the emir of Mosul, acknowledges Saladin's sovereignty.
 July 20– September 15. Baldwin V dies. Raymond III leaves Jerusalem before the funeral and summons his partisans to a general assembly at Nablus. Joscelin III takes possession of Jerusalem, Acre and Beirut. Ignoring Raymond III's objections, Raynald and the grand master of the Templars, Gerard de Ridefort, accompany Sybilla to the Holy Sepulchre and Patriarch Heraclius crowns her queen. Her supporters cannot persuade her to divorce Guy and she crowns him king.
 October. Raymond III and his supporters offer the crown to Sybilla's half-sister, Isabella, and her husband, Humphrey IV, in Nablus. Humphrey IV flees from Nablus and swears fealty to Sybilla and Guy. All his former supporters, except for Raymond III and Baldwin of Ibelin, hurry to pay homage to the royal couple. Raymond III seeks Saladin's alliance against Guy.
1187
 Early. Contrary to the truce, Raynald seizes a caravan and Guy cannot persuade him to return the spoils and the prisoners.
 March 29. Saladin declares the jihad against the crusaders.
 Late April. Raymond III allows Saladin's commander Muzzafar al-Din to march across Galilee. 
 May 1. Battle of Cresson: Muzzafar al-Din annihilates an army of Hospitallers and Templars.
 May 2. Raymond III's Galilean vassals persuade him to abandon his alliance with Saladin and to make peace with Guy.
 June 26. After gathering more than 30,000 troops, Saladin invades the Kingdom of Jerusalem. The Frank troops start gathering at Saffuriya and the garrisons are reduced to the minimum in most fortresses and towns.
 July 4. Saladin annihilates the army of the Kingdom of Jerusalem in the Battle of Hattin. The Frank commanders fall into captivity. Raynald, the Hospitallers and the Templars are executed.

 July 5. Tiberias surrenders to Saladin.
 July 9. Saladin captures Acre.
 July 14. William Longsword's brother, Conrad of Montferrat, arrives at Tyre and begins to organise the resistance. He grants privileges to the Pisans in return for their assistance.
 July 10–September 4. Saladin captures Jaffa, Arsuf, Caesarea, Haifa, Sidon and Ascalon.
 October 2. After receiving a free passage to the townspeople for a huge ransom, the defenders of Jerusalem surrender to Saladin.

Third Crusade (1187-1192)
1187
 October. Conrad sends Joscius, Archbishop of Tyre, to Europe to ask for a new crusade.
 October 29. Pope Gregory VIII declares a new crusade, now known as the Third Crusade, in his bull .

 November 25. Saladin lays siege to Tyre.
1188
 January 1. Saladin abandons the siege of Tyre.
 May. Saladin releases Guy.
 October. A Sicilian fleet arrives at the Holy Land.
 November Saladin's troops capture Kerak.
 December 6. Safad is captured by Saladin's troops.
1189
 January 5. Belvoir surrenders to Saladin's troops.
 May. Saladin's troops capture Montreal. Only Tyre and Belfort remain under Frank rule in the Kingdom of Jerusalem.
 August. Guy's brother, Geoffrey of Lusignan, informs him about the preparations for a new crusade in Europe. They gather 9,000 troops and march to Tyre, but Conrad does not allow Guy to enter the town.
 August 26. Guy lays siege to Acre with the support of a Pisan fleet.
 September. Flemish, Danish, Frisian and French crusaders arrive at Acre.
 October 4. Saladin defeats the crusaders at Acre. Fearing an epidemic, he leaves Acre, but he appoints his brother, Al-Adil, to command his troops.
1190

 Easter. Conrad acknowledges Guy as the lawful king in return for the confirmation of his rule of Tyre.
 June 10. Frederick I, Holy Roman Emperor, drowns in the Saleph River in Asia Minor during his crusade.
 Summer. Patriarch Heraclius dies at Acre.
 July 27. Henry II, Count of Champagne arrives at Acre, taking new troops and funds with him.
 July 29. Sybilla and her two daughters by Guy die at Acre.
 Early October. Frederick VI, Duke of Swabia, and the remnants of Frederick I's crusade arrive at Acre. A hospital is established for them at the crusaders' camp.
  November 20. Guy's opponents persuade the papal legate, Ubaldo of Pisa, to annul the marriage of Humphrey IV and Isabella.

 November 24. Conrad marries Isabella in Tyre to strengthen his position against Guy.
1191
 April 20. Philip II, King of France, and the French crusaders land at Acre. He acknowledges Conrad's claim to the throne against Guy.
 May 6–June 1. Richard I, King of England, conquers Cyprus.
 May 11. Guy meets with Richard I in Cyprus.
 June 8. Richard I disembarks at Acre.
 July 12. The garrisons of Acre surrender to the crusaders in return for a safe passage.
 July 24 or 26. Richard I and Philip II confirm Guy's right to rule the kingdom until his death, but they also stipulate that Conrad is to succeed Guy on the throne.
 July 31. Philip II departs for France.
 August 20. Richard I decides to continue the military campaign and orders the massacre of 2,700 Muslim prisoners.
 September 7. Battle of Arsuf: Richard I overcomes Saladin.
 September 10. Richard I seizes Jaffa without resistance.
 October. Richard I offers the hands of his sister, Joan, to Al-Adil, proposing that they could jointly rule the restored kingdom, but she refuses to marry a Muslim.
  November 15. Conrad proposes a separate peace to Saladin who informs the crusaders about Conrad's offer.
1192
 January 20. The crusaders seize the abandoned Ascalon.
 April 16. After Richard decides to return to England, the Frank barons persuade him to acknowledge Conrad as the lawful king.
 April 28. Assassins murder Conrad in Tyre.
 May. Richard I authorizes Guy to purchase Cyprus from the Templars.
 May 5. Henry II of Champagne marries Conrad's pregnant widow, Isabella in Acre.
 June 11. The crusaders march as far as Bayt Nuba near Jerusalem, but Richard I decides not to attack the Holy City for fear of being deprived of water.
 September 2. A truce between Saladin and Richard I confirms the Franks' rule on the coast from Tyre to Jaffa.
 October 9. Richard I departs for England.
  October 15. Saladin grants parts of Caymont to Balian of Ibelin and half of Sidon to Reginald of Sidon. Henry I restores Haifa, Caesarea and Arsuf to their previous lords and grants Jaffa to Aimery of Lusignan.

Second kingdom

Recovery (1193-1229)
1193
 March 4. Saladin dies in Damascus. Conflicts between his sons, brothers and nephews cause the disintegration of his empire.

 May. Henry I limits the Pisans' presence in Acre for their alliance with Guy. They pillage the coast and Henry I expels them from the entire kingdom. He imprisons Guy's brother Aimery, but the barons and the grand masters persuade him to release Aimery.
 1194
 The canons of the Holy Sepulchre elect Aymar the Monk as the Latin patriarch without consulting Henry I. He imprisons them, but Archbishop Joscius mediates a reconciliation. Pope Celestine III confirms Aymar's election.
1194
 Spring. Leo II of Cilicia captures Bohemond III. Henry I hurries to Sis and achieves his release.
 May. Aimery inherits Cyprus from Guy. He concludes an agreement with Henry I and mediates a reconciliation between Henry I and the Pisans.
1195
 August 1. The Pope urges Henry VI, Holy Roman Emperor, to launch a new crusade.
1196
 Summer. German crusaders arrive at Acre.
 July. Al-Adil seizes Damascus from Saladin's son, Al-Afdal.
1197
 Early September. Al-Adil captures Jaffa. The German crusaders ignore Henry I's ban and make raids against Muslim territories.
 September 10. Henry I falls from the window of the royal palace and dies in Acre.
  September 15. Some barons offer the throne to Raoul of Saint Omer, but the military orders achieve the election of Aimery as king.
 October. Aimery marries Isabella. Patriarch Aymar crowns them king and queen. Aimery has his seat at Acre, but he keeps the administration of the two realms separate.
 Late October. German and Frank troops seize Sidon and Beirut.
 November 28. The Germans and Franks besiege Toron.
1198
 Early. Aimery accuses Raoul and Hugh II of Saint Omer of an unsuccessful attempt on his life and banishes them from the kingdom. They appeal to their peers, but Aimery does not repeal his decision. 
 February 2. The siege of Toron is abandoned after news of the death of Henry VI, Holy Roman Emperor, reaches the crusaders' camp.
 June 1. A new truce with Al-Adil.
 August 15. Pope Innocent III proclaims the Fourth Crusade in the bull Post Miserabile.
1200
 February. Al-Adil takes control of Egypt.
 The Pope urges women to make donations for the crusaders instead of joining a crusade.
1202
 Spring. Reginald of Dampierre and 300 crusaders land at Acre. They leave for Antioch after Henry I prohibits them from breaking the truce.
1203
 May. The leaders of the Fourth Crusade decide to attack Constantinople.
1204
 May. Aimery sends a fleet to raid the Nile Delta.
 April 12. The crusaders capture Constantinople. The establishment of the Latin Empire of Constantinople weakens the position of the Kingdom of Jerusalem, because the new crusader states on the ruins of the Byzantine Empire attract many crusaders from Europe.
 September. Aimery and Al-Adil conclude a six-year truce. The Franks take full control of Sidon, Lydda and Ramla.
1205
 May 1. Aimery dies in Acre.
 Late. Isabella dies. Her daughter by Conrad, Maria of Montferrat, succeeds her. Isabella's half-brother, John of Ibelin, assumes the regency for the 13-year-old queen.
 1206
 The barons propose Maria to the married Peter II of Aragon, but the Pope does not annul Peter's marriage.
1206
 After being appointed as the Latin patriarch by the Pope, Albert of Vercelli comes to the Holy Land.
 1207
 Patriarch Albert completes a regulation for the hermits living on Mount Carmel at the request of their head, Brocard.

1208
 The barons send Aymar, Lord of Caesarea, and Walter of Florence, Bishop of Acre, to France to ask Philip II to appoint a husband for Maria. Philip II names John of Brienne as his candidate.
1209
 The Pope approves John's candidacy and gives 40,000 marks for the defence of the Holy Land.
1210
 July. Al-Adil proposes 10 villages in return for the renewal of the truce, but the Templars and the prelates prevent the High Court from accepting the offer.
 September 13. John and his retinue of 300 knights land at Haifa.
 September 14. John marries Maria in Acre.
 October 3. John and Maria are crowned in Tyre. Al-Adil's son, Al-Mu'azzam Isa, makes a raid against Acre.
 October. John launches a plundering raid as far as the Jordan.
1211
 Spring. John sends Walter of Montbéliard to launch a naval raid against the Nile Delta.
 Summer. John sends 50 knights to assist the Templars against Leo in Cilicia.
1212
 July. John and Al-Adil conclude a six-year truce. 
 Late. Maria dies after giving birth to a daughter, Isabella. After some barons challenge John's right to rule the kingdom, he sends his chancellor, Raoul of Merencourt, to the Holy See. The Pope menaces those who do not obey John with ecclesiastical sanctions.
1213
 Early. Hugh I of Cyprus imprisons a group of John's supporters.
 Late April. The Pope proclaims the Fifth Crusade in his bull Quia maior.
1214
 John marries Leo II's daughter, Stephanie of Armenia.
 A cleric murders Patriarch Albert. Raoul of Merencourt is elected as the Latin patriarch.
1215
 Francis of Assisi's disciple, Giles, settles in the kingdom.
1217
 October. Andrew II of Hungary and Leopold VI of Austria arrive at Acre. Troops from Antioch and Cyprus join the crusaders.
 November. The crusaders capture Beisan.
 November 29–December 7. The crusaders cannot take the Muslim fortress on Mount Tabor.
1218
 Early. Andrew II, Hugh I and Bohemond IV leave the crusaders' camp.
 Spring. Caesarea is fortified. Château Pèlerin is built on the coast near Acre.
 May 29. The crusaders, along with troops from Jerusalem and Cyprus, lay siege to Damietta under John's command.

 August 31. Al-Adil dies. Al-Kamil inherits Egypt, Al-Mu'azzam seizes Syria.
 September. Pope Honorius III's legate, Pelagius, arrives at Damietta.
1219
 May 2. Leo II dies after bequeathing Cilicia to his youngest daughter, Isabella. John lays claim to Cilicia on behalf of his wife and their son.
 October. Al-Kamil offers to cede all lands to the west of the Jordan in Palestine to the crusaders if they leave Egypt. John is willing to accept the offer, but Pelagius rejects it.
 November 5. The crusaders capture Damietta. John is appointed to rule the town.
 Late November. Al-Mu'azzam sacks Caesarea.
1220
 February. The Pope confirms John's claim to Cilicia.
 Easter. Urged by his bailiff, Garnier l'Aleman, John returns to Acre.
 Summer (?). John's wife and their son die. The Pope acknowledges another claimant as the lawful ruler of Cilicia.
 October. Al-Mu'azzam destroys the Templars' fortress at Destroit.
1221
 June. Louis I, Duke of Bavaria, and German crusaders arrive at Damietta.
 July 6. John returns to Damietta.
 July–August. The crusaders march towards Cairo along the Nile, but the flood and Al-Kamil's troops trap them.

 August 28. Pelagius and Al-Kadil agree about the evacuation of the crusaders from Egypt. Al-Kadil offers an eight-year truce.
 September 8. The crusaders leave Damietta.
1222
 Summer. Parts of Acre are destroyed during an armed conflict between the Pisans and Genoese.
 October. John, Patriarch Raoul and the grand master of the Hospitallers, Guérin de Montaigu, leave for Europe to ask for a new crusade and to find a husband for Isabella II. John appoints Odo of Montbéliard as bailiff.
1223
 March. The Pope, Holy Roman Emperor Frederick II, John and the grand masters of the military orders agree to the marriage of Frederick II and Isabella II. The Emperor promises to allow John to continue to administer the kingdom.
 Summer. John stays in northeastern France.
 August 6. John attends the coronation of Louis VIII of France at Reims.
 November–December. John visits England. 
1224
 May. After making a pilgrimage to Santiago de Compostella, John marries Berengaria of León.
 Patriarch Raoul dies.
1225
 Early. Gerold of Lausanne is appointed as the Latin patriarch.
 July 25. Frederick II promises the Pope to launch a crusade before September 1227.
 August. Isabella II is crowned in Tyre before she leaves for Italy.
 November 9. Frederick II marries Isabella II in Brindisi. The Jerusalemite barons who are present at the wedding pay homage to Frederick II. Frederick II sends Richer, Bishop of Melfi, to the Kingdom of Jerusalem to receive the homage of the local barons.
1227
 August. Frederick II appoints Thomas, Count of Acerra as bailiff.
 September 8. Frederick II sails for the Holy Land, but illness forces him to return to Italy.
 September 29. Pope Gregory IX excommunicates Frederick II for the breaking of his crusader oath.
 October. German, French and English crusaders land at Acre and assist the Franks in fortifying the towns. The Teutonic Knights rebuild the castle of Montfort.
1228
 Spring. Frederick II's marshal, Richard Filangieri, arrives at Acre. He forbids all raids against Muslim territories.
 April 25. The birth of Conrad, the only son of Frederick II by Isabella II.
 May 5. Isabella II dies in Andria and the infant Conrad succeeds her as king of Jerusalem.
 June 28. Frederick II sails for the crusade, but the Pope confirms his excommunication.
 Late July. Frederick II receives the homage of the Jerusalemite barons in Limassol. He demands Beirut from John of Ibelin who refers the case to the High Court.
 September 7. Frederick II lands at Acre and starts negotiations with Al-Kamil.
1229
 February 18. Frederick II and Al-Kamil sign the Treaty of Jaffa, to last for ten and a half years, that restores Jerusalem to the Franks, but they are not allowed to fortify it. The Muslims are allowed to retain the Dome of the Rock and the Al-Aqsa Mosque.

 March 17. Frederick II enters Jerusalem.
 March 18. Frederick II crowns himself in the Holy Sepulchre.
 March 19. Peter of Limoges, Archbishop of Caesarea, places Jerusalem under an interdict because of the presence of Frederick II and the Muslims on behalf of Patriarch Gerald.

Absent kings (1229-1268)
1229
 May 1. Frederick II departs for Italy. He appoints Balian Grenier and Garnier l'Aleman as his bailiffs.
 Summer. Beduins attack pilgrims on the road from Jaffa to Jerusalem and sack Jerusalem. Alice of Champagne (the daughter of Henry II and Isabella I) lays claim to Jerusalem, arguing that Conrad II forfeited the throne because he had failed to come to Jerusalem, but the High Court does not decide the case.
1230
 May. Jerusalemite delegates meet with Frederick II in Foggia, but they cannot convince him to send Conrad II to the Kingdom of Jerusalem.
 September 1. Pope Gregory IX lifts Frederick II's excommunication and recognizes him as the lawful ruler of Jerusalem.
 Autumn. Patriarch Gerold lifts the interdict and the Catholic clerics start taking possession of the churches in Jerusalem. 
 Late. Frederick sends Richard Filangieri to confiscate the fiefs of John of Ibelin and his allies. Filangieri besieges Beirut.
1231
 Early. The High Court acknowledges Richard Filangieri as Frederick II's bailiff, but maintains that no fiefs can be confiscated without a proper judgement.
 Autumn. Filangieri ignores the High Court's decision and again besieges Beirut. His arbitrary act stirs up strong opposition in the towns.
1232
 February. John of Ibelin marches to Beirut, but he cannot relieve the fortress.
 Spring. The townspeople form a commune in Acre to guard their liberties against Filangieri. John of Ibelin comes to Acre and seizes Frederick II's fleet. He march to Tyre, forcing Filangieri to abandon the siege of Beirut.
 May 2. Battle of Casal Imbert: Filangieri routes John of Ibelin near Tyre. Filangieri tries to conquer Cyprus, but Ibelin sends reinforcements from Acre, Beirut and Tyre to the island. Henry I of Cyprus who supports John of Ibelin comes of age.
 Late May. John of Ibelin concludes an alliance with the Genoese and returns to Cyprus.
 June 15. Battle of Agridi: John of Ibelin defeats Filangieri in Cyprus.
 July. Frederick II persuades the Pope to summon Patriarch Gerold to Rome and to order the Latin Patriarch of Antioch, Albert of Rizzato, to represent the Emperor's interests in the kingdom.
  December 31. Frederick II appoints Philip of Maugastel as his bailiff in Acre and orders the dissolution of the Commune at Acre. John of Caesarea stirs up a riot and prevents Maugastel from assuming the government. The High Court rules that Frederick II's appointments by letter are invalid and Conrad II is to come to the kingdom to appoint a new bailiff. The High Court also declares Balian Grenier and Odo of Montbéliard as lawful bailiffs, but Filangieri continues to administer Tyre.
1233
 April. John of Ibelin expels Filangieri from Cyprus, forcing him to return to Italy to urge Frederick II to send reinforcements.
 July 26. Patriarch Gerold sails for Rome.
1234
 August. The Pope urges John of Ibelin to obey the Emperor.
 Autumn. The Pope proclaims a new crusade to strengthen the defence of the Holy Land by the time the 1229 truce expires. The papal legate, Theodoric, Archbishop of Ravenna, places Acre under interdict for failing to dissolve the Commune.
1235
 Early. The Pope cancels the ecclesiastical sanctions against Frederick II's enemies and the townspeople of Acre, fearing of their conversion to Oriental Christianity. 
 October. Jerusalemite troops support the Hospitallers against Al-Muzaffar Umar, the emir of Hama.
1236
 Early. John of Ibelin dies after a riding accident.
 February. The delegates of the burghers of Acre agree to dissolve the Commune of Acre at their meeting with the Pope, but the townspeople do not ratify the agreement.
 Spring/Summer. The relationship between the Pope and Frederick II becomes tense after the Emperor's campaigns in Italy.
1237
 The Pope sends Patriarch Gerold back to the kingdom, also appointing him as papal legate.
 The Jacobite patriarch Ignatius III David presents a statement of faith to the Dominicans during his visit in Jerusalem.

1238
 March 9. Al-Adil dies. His son, Al-Adil II, succeeds him in Egypt, but he is unable to seize Damascus.
1239
 March 20. The Pope excommunicates Frederick II.
 September 1. Theobald I, King of Navarre, and the first crusaders from France land at Acre. A Muslim army sacks the undefended Jerusalem.
 November 2. The crusaders leave Acre for Ascalon.
 November 12. Henry II, Count of Bar; Hugh IV, Duke of Burgundy; Walter of Brienne and other crusader leaders leave the main army to attack an Egyptian army near Gaza.
 November 13. Battle of Gaza: the Egyptians annihilate the crusaders, killing or capturing more than 1,500 foot soldiers. The Egyptians leave the battlefield and the grand masters of the Templars and Hospitallers dissuade Theobald I from pursuing them. The main army returns to Ascalon.
 December. An-Nasir Daud, emir of Kerak, captures Jerusalem and destroys the Tower of David.
1240
 May 14. Robert of Nantes is appointed patriarch of Jerusalem, although he will not arrive in the east until 1244.
 Summer. Al-Adil II's retainers depose him and make his brother, As-Salih Ayyub, the ruler of Egypt. Ayyub's opponent, As-Salih Ismail, Emir of Damascus, offers the region of Sidon and the castle of Belfort to the Franks in return for their assistance against Egypt. Ismail forces the garrison of Belfort to surrender and cedes it to the Franks. Although the Hospitallers and several crusaders urge him not to accept Ismail's offer, Theobald I marches to Jaffa where Ismail joins him. Ayyub offers Galilee to the Franks if they remain neutral and the Hospitallers persuade Theobald I to return to Acre.
 September. Theobald II and Peter of Dreux leave for France, but Hugh IV and Guigues IV of Forez stay behind to fortify Ascalon.
 October 8. Frederick II's brother-in-law, Richard of Cornwall, and English crusaders arrive at Acre.
 November. Richard sends envoys to Ayyub to discuss the cession of the territories promised to Theobald I. The Templars continue to oppose the truce with Egypt.
1241
 February. Ayub signs the treaty with the crusaders. Galilee and the hinterland of Jaffa is restored to the kingdom which reaches its greatest territorial extent after 1187.

 May 3. Richard leave for England.
 June 7. Four baronsBalian of Beirut, Philip of Montfort, John of Arsuf and Geoffrey of Estreingurge Frederick II to appoint his brother-in-law, Simon of Montfort, as bailiff to put an end to the internal strifes in the kingdom.
 Autumn. Most crusaders who have remained in the kingdom leave for Europe. Filangieri tries to seize Acre with the Hospitallers' assistance, but Philip of Montfort forces him to return to Tyre. Balian of Beirut and the Templars besiege the Hospitallers' fortress in Acre.
1242
 Spring. Conrad II comes of age and Frederick II decides to replace Filangieri with Thomas of Acerra. The new Venetian bailiff, Marsilio Zorzi, demands one third of Tyre from Filangieri and makes an alliance with Frederick II's opponents. Some burghers of Tyre seek Philip of Montfort's assistance against Filangieri.
  June 1. Filangieri appoints his brother, Lother, as the commander of Tyre and leaves for Europe.
 June 5. The High Court elects Alice (Conrad II's nearest relative who lives in the kingdom) and her third husband, Ralph of Nesle, as bailiffs.
 July 10. Frederick II's opponents capture Tyre with Venetian and Genoese support. Only Ascalon and Jerusalem remain under the control of Frederick II's supporters.
 October 30. The Templars sack Hebron and destroy the mosque.
1243
 August. Frederick II grants Ascalon to the Hospitallers.
1244
 April. Thomas of Acerra formally cedes Ascalon to the Hospitallers.
 August 23. Khwarizmian Turks, who were expelled from their homeland by the Mongols, capture Jerusalem and massacre its Christian inhabitants during their march towards Egypt. Jerusalem is lost to the Franks forever.
 October 17. Battle of La Forbie: Ayyub and the Khwarazmians overcome Ismail and his allies, including the Franks from Jerusalem and Antioch. More than 90% of the knights of the military orders perish in the battlefield.

1245
 Summer. Pope Innocent IV proclaims the Seventh Crusade at the First Council of Lyon.
 October. Ayyub occupies Damascus.
1246
 Alice dies and her son, Henry I of Cyprus, succeeds her as regent. He appoints Balian of Beirut as bailiff and grants Tyre to Philip of Montfort.
 1247
 Henry I grants the County of Jaffa and the Lordship of Ramla to John of Ibelin.
1247
 June 17. Ayyub occupies Tiberias.
 Late June. Mount Tabor and Belvoir surrender to Ayyub's troops.
 October 15. The Egyptians capture Ascalon.
 After Balian of Beirut's death, Henry I appoints John of Arsuf as bailiff.
1248
 September 17. Louis IX of France and the French crusaders arrive at Limassol. Louis IX makes preparations for the invasion of Egypt. John of Arsuf is replaced by John Foignon as bailiff.
1249
 June 5. Louis IX and the crusaders start the invasion of Egypt.
 Autumn. John of Arsuf is again appointed as bailiff.
 November 23. Ayyub dies, but his retainers keep his death secret until the arrival of his son and successor, Al-Muazzam Turanshah.
 1250
 The Livre des Assises de la Cour des Bourgeoisa legal treatise on the laws regarding the burghers and their courtsis completed.
1250
 February 24. The Egyptians impose a blockade on the crusaders' camp.
 May 2. Turanshah's Mamluk (or slave) guards kill him and make their commander, Aybak, the new ruler of Egypt.
 May 6. Louis IX agrees to leave Egypt.
 May 13. Louis IX arrives at Acre and becomes the actual ruler of the kingdom.
 Winter. The suburbs are fortified in Acre.
1251
 Summer. Caesarea is fortified.

1252
 Summer. Jaffa is fortified.
1253
 January 18. Henry I dies.
 March 26. The Pope takes John of Jaffa and his family under his protection, reserving the right to apply ecclesiastic sanctions against them or their subjects for the Holy See.
 June. Louis IX sends William Rubruck and Bartholomew of Cremona to Karakorum to propose an alliance to Möngke, Great Khan of the Mongols, against the Muslim powers.
1254
 March 6. Conrad II dies in Lavello in Italy. His successor, the two-year-old Conradin, remains in Bavaria under the guardianship of his uncle, Louis II, Duke of Bavaria.
 April 24. Louis IX leaves Acre for France. He appoints Geoffrey of Sergines as the commander of 100 knights who are left behind in the kingdom.

 June 8. Patriarch Robert of Nantes dies. He is succeeded by Jacques Pantaleon.
1255
 February. John of Jaffa succeeds John of Arsuf as bailiff. He concludes a 10-year truce with An-Nasir Yusuf, the Ayyebite ruler of Damascus.
 Late December. Geoffrey of Sergines makes a raid in the region of Ascalon and Gaza.
1256
 June. A dispute over property rights in the estates of the Baselite monastery of Saint Sabas in Acre develops into an armed conflict between Genoese and Venetian merchants. The Genoese and the Pisans destroy parts of the Venetian quarter and Philip of Montfort expels the Venetians from Tyre.
1257
 March. The emir of Jerusalem raids the region of Jaffa, but the Franks route him.
 July. The Venetians conclude an alliance with the Pisans.
 August. John of Arsuf grants commercial privileges to merchants from Ancona who support the Genoese.
 Autumn. The united Venetian and Pisan fleets defeat the Genoese at Acre.
1258
 February. John of Arsuf and the Templars' grand master, Thomas Bérard, convoke the barons and the burghers' representatives to a general assembly. They elect the infant Hugh II, King of Cyprus, as regent for the absent Conrad II and appoint Hugh II's mother, Plaisance of Antioch, as regent for him. The Genoese, the Hospitallers and their allies do not accept the decision. Plaisance appoints John of Arsuf as her bailiff before she returns to Cyprus.
 February. Möngke's brother, Hülegü, occupies Baghdad. The Abbasid Caliph, Al-Musta'sim, is murdered.
 June. A Venetian fleet routes the Genoese at Acre. Philip of Montfort comes to Acre to assist the Genoese, but after their defeat he returns to Tyre.
 Late. John of Arsuf dies.
1259
 May. Plaisance makes Geoffrey of Sergines her bailiff.
 September. The Mongols invade Syria. Hethum I, King of Armenia, and Bohemond VI of Antioch join the Mongols, but the Jerusalemite barons remain neutral.
1260
 January. The Mongols capture Aleppo.
 March 1. The Mongols capture Damascus. Hülegü departs for Karakorum to participate in the election of the new great khan, accompanied by the bulk of his army.
 Summer. The Mamluk Sultan of Egypt, Qutuz, proposes an alliance to the Franks. The Jerusalemite barons do not accept his offer, but allow the Mamluk troops to march across the kingdom.
 September 3. Battle of Ain Jalut: the Mamluks annihilate the Mongol army.
 September 8. The Mamluks capture Damascus.
 October 24. Baibars murders Qutuz and the Mamluks acclaim him sultan.
1261
 John of Arsuf begins selling his estates to the Hospitallers.
 Latin Patriarch of Jerusalem Jacques Pantaleon is elected as Pope Urban IV and is succeeded by William of Agen.
 September. Plaisance dies. Hugh II is still a minor, but his kin do not claim the regency in Jerusalem.
1263
 March. Baibars pillages Nazareth and Bethlehem and destroys the Church of the Nativity.
 April 4. Baibars unsuccessfully besieges Acre, but he destroys the suburbs. Geoffrey of Sergines is wounded during the siege.
 April. Hugh II's aunt, Isabella of Cyprus, comes to Acre to exercise the regency on his behalf in Jerusalem. She appoints her husband, Henry of Antioch, as her deputy, but the High Court refuses to install them without Hugh II's presence.
1264
 June. The Hospitallers and the Templars make a raid into the region of Ascalon. Baibars pillages the environs of Caesarea and Chastel Pelerin.
 July. The Pope urges the prelates, the grand masters of the military orders and the most influential barons to resolve their conflicts.
 Isabella dies. Her son, Hugh of Antioch-Lusignan, and his cousin, Hugh of Brienne, claim the right to exercise the regency on Hugh II's behalf in Jerusalem. The High Court confirms Hugh of Antioch-Lusignan's claim.
 1265
 John of Jaffa completes Le Livre des Assises (the most complete treatise on the laws of Jerusalem).
1265
 March 5. Baibars captures and destroys Caesarea.
 March 16. Baibars cannot take Chastel Pelerin, but he destroys Haifa.
 April 30. Arsuf surrenders to Baibars, who destroys it.
 May. Hugh of Antioch-Lusignan comes to the kingdom accompanied by 130 knights and mounted squires.
 October. Odo, Count of Nevers, and 50 French crusaders arrive at Acre.
1266
 January. Erhard of Valery and Erhard of Nanteuil lead French crusaders to Acre.
 July 22. Baibars captures Safed, Toron and Chastel Neuf and takes control of all of Galilee.

 October. Hugh of Antioch-Lusignan, Geoffrey of Sergines and the military orders make a joint raid in Galilee.
1267
 March 27. Louis IX again takes the Cross in France.
 December. Hugh II dies and Hugh of Antioch-Lusignan succeeds him.
1268
 March 7. Baibars captures and destroys Jaffa.
 April 15. Belfort surrenders to Baibars.
 May. The High Court elects Hugh III as regent for Conradin, ignoring the claim of his aunt, Maria of Antioch.
 August 23. Battle of Tagliacozzo: Charles I of Anjou, King of Sicily, routes Conradin in Italy.
 October 29. Conradin is beheaded in Naples.

Final years (1269-1291)
1269
 September 24. Hugh III of Cyprus (great-grandson of Isabella I and Henry of Champagne) and Maria of Antioch (granddaughter of Isabella I and Aimery of Lusignan) lay claim to Jerusalem. The High Court rejects her claim and elects Hugh as king. Hugh is crowned in Tyre.
 Late October. Two natural sons of James I of Aragon, Fernán Sánchez and Pedro Fernández, and Aragonese crusaders arrive at Acre.
 November. Baibars routes the Aragonese crusaders near Acre.
1270
 July 20. Louis IX and the French crusaders land at Tunis, because he thinks that Muhammad I al-Mustansir, the emir of Tunis, is willing to convert to Christianity.
 August 25. Louis IX dies near Tunis.
 November 11. The French crusaders depart from Tunis for France.
 The Venetians and the Genoese conclude a truce. The Genoese are allowed to return to Acre.
1271
 May 9. The crown prince of England, Edward, and English crusaders arrive at Acre.
 May–June. Edward unsuccessfully besieges Qaqun on Mount Carmel.
 June 23. Baibars captures the Teutonic Knights' fortress at Montfort.
 July. The Cypriot nobles decline to come to fight in the Kingdom of Jerusalem. Their leader is John of Jaffa's son, James of Ibelin.
 John of Montfort, Lord of Tyre, concludes a truce with Baibars.

1272
 May 12. Hugh and Baibars conclude a 10-year truce.
  September 30. Edward and the English crusaders depart for England.
1274
 May 7–July 17. Second Council of Lyon: a plan for a new crusade is adopted. Pope Gregory X persuades Charles I of Anjou to start negotiations for the purchase of Mary of Antioch's claim to Jerusalem.
1275
 March. After the death of Bohemond VI of Antioch (who ruled the remnants of the Principality of Antioch and the County of Tripoli), Hugh claims the regency for the 14-year-old Bohemond VII, but the High Court of Antioch elects Bohemond VII's mother, Sibylla of Armenia, to the post.
1276
 October. After a debate about the purchase of an estate near Acre by the Templars without his consent, Hugh leaves for Cyprus.
1277
 March 18. Maria of Antioch sells her claim to Jerusalem to Charles I with the Pope's consent. The Venetians, the Templars and the French garrison in Acre support Charles I.

 May–June. Charles I appoints Roger of San Severino as his bailiff. San Severino takes possession of the royal castle in Acre without opposition.
 July 1. Baibars dies and his son, Al-Said Barakah, succeeds him.
 July. Guillaume de Beaujeu, the Templars' grand master, mediates a reconciliation between John of Montfort and the Venetians. The Venetians acknowledge John's rule in Tyre and John restores their quarter to them.
 September. Patriarch Thomas dies. The canons of the Holy Sepulchre ask the Pope to translate the Archbishop of Naples (whose see was located in Charles I's realm) to Jerusalem.
1279
 May. Pope Honorius IV appoints Elias, Bishop of Périgueux, as the Latin Patriarch.
 August. Al-Mansur Qalawun becomes the sultan of Egypt.
 Hugh leads an army to Tyre to fight against San Severino, but the Templars prevent him from attacking Acre.
1281
 May. Qalawun concludes a truce with the Kingdom of Jerusalem.
1282
 April. After the Sicilian Vespers, Charles I recalls San Severino to Italy. Before leaving Acre, San Severino appoints Odo Poilechien as his deputy in Acre.
1283
 Burchard of Mount Sion completes his Description of the Holy Land about his travels in the Holy Land and the neighboring territories.
1284
 March 4. Hugh dies in Tyre. His 17-year-old son, John II, is recognized as his successor in Jerusalem only in Beirut and Tyre.
1285
 January 7. Charles I dies. His son and successor, Charles II of Naples, also inherits his claim to Jerusalem.
 May 20. John II dies. His brother, Henry II, succeeds him.
1286
 June 24. Henry II arrives at Acre. The military orders acknowledge him as the lawful king of Jerusalem.
 June 29. Odo Poilechien surrenders the citadel of Acre to Henry II.
 August 15. Henry II is crowned in Tyre.
1287
 May. Qalawun occupies the last remnants of the County of Tripoli.
  December 31. Patriarch Elias dies in Rome.
1289
 Early. Pope Nicholas IV appoints Nicholas of Hanapes as Latin Patriarch.
 July. Qalawun and Henry II conclude a 10-year truce.
1290
 Early. Pope Nicholas IV calls for a new crusade for the defence of Acre.
  August 15. Italian crusaders arrive at Acre and murder Muslim merchants.
 Late August. Drunken Italian crusaders massacre all bearded men in Acre. Qalawun demands the extradition of the murderers, but the Frank authorities refuse it.
 November 10. Qalawun dies. His son, Al-Ashraf Khalil, succeeds him. 
1291
 April 5. Al-Ashraf Khalil lays siege to Acre.

 Early May. Henry II and Cypriot knights come to Acre.
 May 19. Tyre surrenders without resistance.
 Late May. After the Mamluks occupy the Templars' keep, Henry II flees from Acre. Patriarch Nicholas drowns while fleeing from the town.
 May 28. The Mamluks capture Acre. The burghers are massacred or enslaved.
 July 14. The Mamluks capture Sidon.
 July 31. Beirut surrenders to the Mamluk troops.

Aftermath 
1290s
 Henry II issues new Cypriot coins with an inscription referring to his title of King of Jerusalem, and displaying the Cross of Jerusalem on the reverse. 
1291
 August. Pope Nicholas IV calls for a new crusade for the recovery of the Holy Land.
1295
 Charles II offers his claim to Jerusalem to James II of Aragon during their negotiations over Sicily.
1299
 Charles II offers his claim to Jerusalem to Frederick III of Sicily as part of his daughter's dowry.
1309–1311
 The Aragonese attempt to convince Charles II's successor, Robert, King of Naples, to renounce his claim to Jerusalem in favor of Frederick III.
1335
 During his visit in Cyprus, James of Verona is informed that the women wear black in mourning for the occupation of the towns on the Syrian coast by the Muslims.
1365
 A member of the Cypriot royal family is rewarded with the Jerusalemite title prince of Galilee.

See also 
 Timeline of the Principality of Antioch

Notes

References

Sources 

 
 
 
 
 
 
 
 
 
 
 
 

 
 
 
 
 
 
 
 
 
 

Jerusalem, Kingdom of